Charles Owen O'Conor, O'Conor Don PC (7 May 1838 – 30 June 1906), was an Irish politician

Life
The eldest son of Denis O'Conor, Charles O'Conor was educated at Downside School in England and became an Irish Liberal Party Member of Parliament (MP) for Roscommon from March 1860 until his defeated at the 1880 general election. He was an unsuccessful candidate for Wexford in 1883. He was appointed High Sheriff of Sligo for 1863 and High Sheriff of Roscommon for 1884.

He was also President of the Society for the Preserving the Irish Language, a precursor of the Gaelic League. He wrote a history of his family called "The O'Conors of Connacht".

He married twice; firstly Georgina Mary, the daughter of Thomas Perry, with whom he had four sons, and secondly Ellen Letitia, the daughter of John Lewis More O'Ferrall, of Co. Longford. He was succeeded by his son, Denis Charles Joseph O'Conor.

References 

 ebooks

External links 
 

1838 births
1906 deaths
People educated at Downside School
Members of the Parliament of the United Kingdom for County Roscommon constituencies (1801–1922)
Irish Liberal Party MPs
Lord-Lieutenants of Roscommon
UK MPs 1859–1865
UK MPs 1865–1868
UK MPs 1868–1874
UK MPs 1874–1880
Charles Owen
Irish chiefs of the name
Members of the Privy Council of Ireland
High Sheriffs of County Sligo
High Sheriffs of Roscommon